Doctor Weil may refer to:

 Andrew Weil, American author and physician, proponent of alternative medicine
 André Weil (1906–1988), French mathematician
 Doctor Weil (Mega Man Zero), a character in the Mega Man Zero video game series

See also
 Weil (disambiguation)